Ischyja albata is a species of moth of the family Noctuidae first described by Felder and Rogenhofer in 1874. It is found in northern Australia, but has also been recorded from Sulawesi.

Adults have brown forewings marked with various mottled patterns. The hindwings have a large central blue patch. They are fruit piercers.

References

Catocalinae